Lloyd Jones or Lloyd-Jones may refer to:

People

Sports
Lloyd Jones (athlete) (1884–1971), American athlete in the 1908 Summer Olympics
Lloyd Jones (figure skater) (born 1988), Welsh ice dancer
Lloyd Jones (English footballer) (born 1995), English footballer
Lloyd Jones (Australian footballer) (1906–1990), Australian footballer for St Kilda

Writers
Lloyd Jones (New Zealand author) (born 1955), New Zealand author
Lloyd Jones (Welsh writer) (born 1951), contemporary novelist from Wales
Lloyd Kenyon Jones, American newspaper journalist, lecturer and author

Other
Lloyd Jones (socialist) (1811–1886), socialist, union activist, journalist and writer
Lloyd Jones (magician) (1906–1984), American magician, pharmacist, book dealer, and publisher
Lloyd Jones (politician) (born 1937), American politician
Lloyd E. Jones (1889–1958), U.S. Army general

Surname
Antonia Lloyd-Jones (born 1962), British translator of Polish literature
Charles Lloyd Jones (1878–1958), chairman of David Jones Limited and chairman of the Australian Broadcasting Commission
David Lloyd-Jones (conductor) (born 1934), British conductor
David Lloyd Jones, Lord Lloyd-Jones (born 1952), British Court of Appeal judge
David Lloyd Jones (architect) (born 1942), British architect
Edward Lloyd Jones (1844–1894), head of the department store David Jones Limited, or his son
Edward Lloyd Jones (1874–1934), Shorthorn cattle breeder and chairman of David Jones Limited, or his brother
Guy Lloyd-Jones (born 1966), British chemist
Hugh Lloyd-Jones (1922–2009), Oxford scholar
Jake Lloyd-Jones (Documentary Maker), Australia
Jean Hall Lloyd-Jones (born 1929), American politician
Jenkin Lloyd Jones (1843–1918), American Unitarian minister and father of Richard Lloyd Jones (Tulsa Tribune)
Jenkin Lloyd Jones Sr. (died 2004), owner and editor of the Tulsa Tribune, son of Richard Lloyd Jones (Tulsa Tribune)
Martyn Lloyd-Jones (1899–1981), British evangelical preacher and theologian
Richard Lloyd-Jones (born 1933), Permanent secretary to the Welsh Office, Chairman of the Arts Council of Wales
Richard Lloyd Jones (1873–1963), founder, owner and editor of the Tulsa Tribune
Robin Lloyd-Jones (born 1934), author

Places
Richard Lloyd Jones Jr. Airport, in Oklahoma

See also
Lloyd Jones Mills (1917–1942), American naval war hero
Loyd A. Jones (1884–1954), American scientist who worked for Kodak